Cut Up is a Swedish death metal band formed by former members of Vomitory in 2014, and is currently signed to Metal Blade Records.

Members 
 Erik Rundqvist – bass guitar, vocals
 Andreas Björnson – guitar, vocals
 Anders Bertilsson – guitar
 Tobias Gustafsson – drums

Discography

References

External links 
 
 
 Cut Up at Metal Blade Records

Metal Blade Records artists
Musical groups established in 2004
Swedish death metal musical groups